Association of Islamic Revolution Loyalists (Jameiyat-e Vafaadaaraan-e Enghelab-e Eslami) is a minor conservative political group in Iran.

In 2016 their candidates withdrew from the legislative election and endorsed the Principlists Grand Coalition.

Notable members 
 Alireza Ali-Ahmadi, former minister
 Abbas Sheybani, former MP
 Ali Marvi, former MP

References 

Principlist political groups in Iran
Political parties established in 2003
2003 establishments in Iran